Maria Albertovna Minogarova (Russian: Мария Альбертовна Миногаровa, born March 15, 1989, Krasnodar, RSFSR) is a Russian model, blogger, YouTuber and TV presenter.

Early life 
Maria was born in the city of Krasnodar in 1989.

Career 

In 2011, she took part in the first season of Top Model po-russki under her nickname Masha, where she came in fourth place. After the show, she worked as a model in Milan.

In 2018, she took part in an episode of the travel show Oryol i Reshka, where, together with Zhanna Badoeva, they visited Kaliningrad. This season was devoted to the cities of Russia. Maria showed how you could relax in Kaliningrad, having only $100. She then co-hosted the second season with Maria Gorban.

Also in 2018, she became the presenter of the Russian version of the show Project Runway, which is broadcast on the TV channel Friday!.

In April 2018, Maria became the ideological inspiration of all Russian-speaking girls whose height is 180 cm and above, she is 185 cm tall. Maria headed the social project I Am Above This, for which in November 2018 received the "Case of the Year" award on the "Glamour. Woman Of The Year.".

In March 2019, Masha released the film Track on her YouTube Channel.

In January 2020, the comedy film Marathon of Desires was published with Agela Tarasova, Kirill Nagiyev and Maria in the lead roles. Dasha Charusus wrote the script with Alexander Gudkov, who was also the director.

Personal life 
Maria lives in Moscow and has a partner named Pavel and has no children.

Social media 
Maria's Instagram has more than 1.2 million followers, over 4,550 posts and apparently follows a thousand users.

References 

1989 births
Living people
Russian television presenters
Russian female models
Russian YouTubers
Russian bloggers
People from Krasnodar
Russian video bloggers
Russian women television presenters
Russian women bloggers